USS LST-594 was an , built for the United States Navy during World War II. The "LST" stands for Landing Ship, Tank, while "USS" stands for United States Ship.  LST-594 was part of the second wave of LSTs, denoted LST Mk.2s, which began production in 1943, replacing the earlier Mk.1 version.  Within the Mk.2 version, there were three classes: LST-1, LST-491 and LST-542. USS LST-594 was a member of the 542 class, which had several operational and armament upgrades over the prior classes.

History
Construction of LST-594 began on July 1, 1944, when her keel was laid down at Evansville, Indiana by the Missouri Valley Bridge & Iron Company (MVB&I). MVB&I was one of five major inland shipbuilders, and, with International Steel Company (also located in Evansville), contributed the greatest number of LST's to the American war effort.  Completed in 43 days, she was launched on August 12, 1944, and was sponsored by Mrs. Everett B. Wiley. She was commissioned September 6, 1944.

The ship was assigned to the Asiatic Pacific Theater.  For her efforts, LST-594 was honored with the American Campaign Medal, Asiatic-Pacific Campaign Medal, World War II Victory Medal, Navy Occupation Service Medal (with Asia clasp), and the Philippines Liberation Medal.

Following the end of World War II, LST-594 performed occupation duty in the Far East. She also saw service in China until mid-February 1946. She was decommissioned on February 21, 1946, and struck from the United States Navy list on March 5, 1947. On June 4, 1947, LST-594 was sold to the government of South Korea.  Her final fate is unknown.

Description

The 542 class of LSTs, of which LST-594 was one, was the third step in the evolution of Mk.2 LSTs.  Changes in the later LST-542 class included the addition of a navigation bridge, the installation of a water distillation plant with a capacity of 4,000 gallons per day, the removal of the tank deck ventilator tubes from the center section of the main deck, the strengthening of the main deck to carry a smaller Landing Craft Tank (LCT), and an upgrade in armor and armament, with the addition of a 3"/50 caliber gun.

References

External links
 Journal of Crewman aboard LST-594

1944 ships
LST-542-class tank landing ships
Ships built in Evansville, Indiana
World War II amphibious warfare vessels of the United States